Leonan José Valandro Gomes (born 28 October 1995), simply known as Leonan, is a Brazilian professional footballer who plays as a left back for Clube do Remo.

Club career
Born in Engenho Velho, Rio Grande do Sul, Leonan started his career at Grêmio's youth setup in 2006. Released in 2011, he represented Caxias and Marcílio Dias, making his senior debut with the latter on 1 September 2013 by starting in a 1–0 Campeonato Catarinense Divisão Especial home win against Canoinhas AC.

Leonan joined Atlético Mineiro in 2013, after impressing in a trial period. He was promoted to the first team ahead of the 2016 season by manager Diego Aguirre, but only made his professional debut on 23 October of that year by starting in a 3–0 home win against Figueirense for the Série A championship.

In 2018, Leonan joined Fortaleza on loan and took part in the 2018 Campeonato Brasileiro Série B winning campaign.

Honours
Atlético Mineiro
Campeonato Mineiro: 2017

Fortaleza
Campeonato Brasileiro Série B: 2018

Remo
Campeonato Paraense: 2022

References

External links
Atlético Mineiro profile 

1995 births
Living people
Brazilian footballers
Association football defenders
Campeonato Brasileiro Série A players
Campeonato Brasileiro Série B players
Clube Náutico Marcílio Dias players
Clube Atlético Mineiro players
Fortaleza Esporte Clube players
Botafogo Futebol Clube (SP) players
Avaí FC players